Homestead Historic District is a historic district in Homestead, Munhall, and West Homestead, Pennsylvania that is listed on the National Register of Historic Places (NRHP). It may also refer to:

(by state then city or town)
Verdugo Homestead Historic District, Randolph, Arizona, listed on the NRHP in Pinal County, Arizona
Pendley Homestead Historic District, Sedona, Arizona, NRHP-listed
Walker Homestead Historic District, Garner, Arkansas, listed on the NRHP in White County, Arkansas
Homestead Meadows Discontiguous District, Estes Park, Colorado, a historic district listed on the NRHP in Larimer County, Colorado
MacFarlane Homestead Historic District, Coral Gables, Florida, NRHP-listed
Homestead Historic Downtown District, Homestead, Florida, NRHP-listed
Union Mills Homestead Historic District, Westminster, Maryland, NRHP-listed
Buckner Homestead Historic District, Stehekin, Washington, NRHP-listed